The 2008 FA Trophy Final was the 39th final of the Football Association's cup competition for levels 5–8 of the English football league system. It was contested by Ebbsfleet United and Torquay United on 10 May 2008 at Wembley Stadium in London.

Ebbsfleet United won the match 1–0 to win the competition for the first time in their history.

Martin Atkinson was the referee.

Match

Details

References

FA Trophy Finals
Fa Trophy Final
Fa Trophy Final
Fa Trophy Final 2008
Fa Trophy Final 2008
Events at Wembley Stadium
FA Trophy Final